Cleophus "Cid" Edwards, (October 10, 1943 – April 6, 2013) was a graduate from Tennessee State University who played professional American football in the NFL from 1968 to 1975. Edwards, a running back, in his play for the San Diego Chargers, had one particularly good year, 1972, wherein the Chargers' offense largely consisted of lobbing screen passes to Edwards, who would rumble down field for much positive yardage.  He is in a sense an obscure folk hero in Chargers lore.

He was also the subject of a bizarre team incident in 1974, when he was suspended by the Chargers for the rest of the season, yet was never told the reason by the coach.  He then learned from secondary sources that the reason given for his suspension was that he missed a team meeting prior to the game before his suspension, yet he was dressed for and played in that game.   The team then gave another reason: he was a bad locker room influence to at least one rookie player.  His tenure ended in San Diego, he would be traded to Chicago for a 3rd round pick, playing in 1975 but catching only one touchdown that year.

References

1943 births
2013 deaths
Sportspeople from Selma, Alabama
American football running backs
Tennessee State Tigers football players
St. Louis Cardinals (football) players
San Diego Chargers players
Chicago Bears players